Atlant may refer to:

 Atlant (book), the first Slovene-language atlas
 Atlant-Soyuz Airlines, a Russian airline
 Atlant Moscow Oblast, a Russian professional ice hockey team 
 The Myasishchev VM-T Atlant, a Russian heavy transport aircraft
 Atlant Stadium, a sports stadium in Belarus
 Atlant-class cruiser of the Soviet Navy

See also

 
 
 Atlanta (disambiguation)
 Atlante (disambiguation)
 Atlas (disambiguation)